This is a list of the highest mountains in Germany.  All of these mountains are located in the federal state of  Bavaria. They lie within the Alps in the region known as the Eastern Alps and are part of the Northern Limestone Alps. The majority belong to the mountain ranges of the Wetterstein, Berchtesgaden Alps and Allgäu Alps.

Because the definition of a mountain is not universally agreed, a distinction is made between main summits and other peaks. Subsidiary summits or subpeaks are not counted. In the Alps a summit is classed as independent, according to the UIAA definition, if it has a prominence of 30 metres or more. In order for a peak to qualify as an independent mountain, however, it must have a prominence of at least 300 metres. Based on this definition only the main summits of entire mountain massifs are counted. All elevations with a prominence below 30 metres are considered as subpeaks.

By these definitions, the highest mountains in Germany are the Zugspitze (2,962 m), Hochwanner (2,746 m) and Watzmann (Middle Peak, 2,713 m). If all independent summits are counted, the Zugspitze is followed by the Schneefernerkopf (2,875 m) and the Middle Wetterspitze (2,747 m) in places two and three. Both are however, part of the Zugspitze massif and lie relatively close to the summit of the Zugspitze itself.

The highest mountain which lies entirely on German soil is the Watzmann with a height of 2,713 metres, followed by the Hochkalter (2,607 m), the Großer Daumen (2,280 m) and the Höfats (2,259 m). Likewise fully on German territory, but considerably less independent, are the Middle Höllentalspitze (2,742 m) and the Hochblassen (2,703 m).

A majority of the summits were verifiably climbed in the 19th century; the Watzmann and Hoher Göll for example as early as 1800. The Zugspitze was officially climbed for the first time in 1820. However, there are many peaks of which it is suspected had been climbed in earlier times by unknown climbers.

Because the borders of Germany have often changed during the course of the centuries, there were different "highest mountains" in the past. For example, during the time of the Holy Roman Empire up to 1806, the Ortler in present-day South Tyrol, at 3,905 m, was the highest German mountain. During the colonial period to 1918 Mount Kilimanjaro in the colony of German East Africa, at 5,895 m, was officially the highest mountain of the German Reich. During the Nazi era from 1938 to 1945 this title went to the Großglockner which, at 3,797 m, is today the highest mountain in Austria.

Key 
 Ranking: The ranking of the peak within Germany in terms of height.
 Photograph: Photograph of the mountain.
 Peak: Name of the peak.
 Height: Height of the mountain in metres.
 Mountain range: Mountain range in which the mountain lies.
 Massif: (table 1) Gives the name of the massif to which the mountain belongs. If the massif is named after a linked main peak, the link is omitted here.
 Location: (table 2) DE = mountain lies entirely on German territory; DE/AT = mountain lies in the area of the border between Germany and Austria, but the peak at least is on German state territory.
 Isolation: The isolation describes the radius of the area which the mountain dominates. Given in kilometres including the reference point.
 Prominence: The prominence is the height difference between height of the summit and the highest point to which one must descend in order to climb a higher peak. Given in metres including the reference point.
 First climb: Name of the first climber and date. Empty field indicates that the first climber or the date is not known.

There may be differences in data from other sources. The tables use the tables of the German height reference system, based on height above Normalnull (~sea level) in Amsterdam, and data from the Bavarian Survey Office (Bayerischen Vermessungsverwaltung).

The highest summits 
Table 1 below shows the 30 highest independent summits in Germany. A summit or peak requires a prominence of over 30 metres in order to count as independent.

By clicking on the symbols at the head of the table the individual columns may be sorted.

 1 First recorded climb. Historic maps from the 18th century suggest that the Zugspitze had already been climbed before 1770.
 2 Year of the first complete crossing of the Jubiläums arête.
 3 Exact value unknown as no survey has been carried out. Estimate based on contours from a topographical map.
 4 First recorded climb. It is possible that it had been climbed during survey work in 1818 or work by a border commission in 1835
 5 As part of a survey

The highest mountains 
Table 2 below shows the 21 highest mountains in Germany. A mountain is considered to be the main summit of a massif if its prominence is more than 300 metres.

By clicking the symbols at the head of the table the individual column may be sorted.

 1 First recorded climb. Historic maps from the 18th century suggest that the Zugspitze had already been climbed before 1770.
 2 As part of a survey
 3 Exact value not known, because it has not been surveyed. Estimate based on contours from a topographical map.

See also 

 List of mountain and hill ranges in Germany
 List of the highest mountains in Austria
 List of mountains in the Elbe Sandstone Mountains
 List of mountains of the Harz

References

Literature 
 DAV-Karte: 4/3 Wetterstein und Mieminger Kette, eastern sheet (1:25,000). 2005
 DAV-Karte: 5/1 Karwendel, western sheet (1:25,000). 2005
 DAV-Karte:  5/2 Karwendel, middle sheet (1:25,000). 2000
 DAV-Karte: 10/1 Steinernes Meer (1:25,000). 2006
 Kompass Wander-, Bike- and Skitourenkarte: Blatt 3 Allgäu Alps, Kleinwalsertal (1:50.000). Kompass-Karten, Innsbruck 2005, 
 Kompass Wander-, Bike and Skitourenkarte: Blatt 03 Oberstdorf, Kleinwalsertal (1:25.000). Kompass-Karten, Innsbruck 2009, 
 Kompass Wander-, Bike and Skitourenkarte: Blatt 25 Zugspitze, Mieminger Kette (1:50.000). Kompass-Karten, Innsbruck 2008,

External links 
 Bayern-Viewer : Online map material for the Federal State of Bavaria

!Germany
!
 
Germany